Holy Trinity is the Church of England parish church for Roehampton, located in Ponsonby Road, SW15.  The building is Grade II* listed. Its spire, which rises 230 feet, is of Corsham stone, a fine grained Bath Stone and is regarded as a landmark for the area.

The church, which is within the diocese of Southwark, was built in 1896–98, and the architect was George Fellowes Prynne.

References

External links
 

Roehampton
Grade II* listed churches in London
19th-century Church of England church buildings
Grade II* listed buildings in the London Borough of Wandsworth